Karl L. Mallette was a Toronto politician and Toronto Transit Commission Chairman and Commissioner.

A compositor by trade, he was first elected to local political office in 1959. He served on the Council of the Borough of Scarborough, first as a Councillor and later as a Controller. He was also a member of the Metropolitan Toronto Council. He was appointed a TTC Commissioner in 1972, and was Chairman from 1973 to 1975. He remained on the Commission until 1984, and served as TTC Vice-Chairman, and as President of TTC subsidiary Gray Coach Lines.

References 
TTC Coupler, September 1973, Vol 48 No 9

Chairs of the Toronto Transit Commission
Metropolitan Toronto councillors